Caladenia macroclavia, commonly known as the large-club spider orchid, or brown bayonets, is a plant in the orchid family Orchidaceae and is endemic to South Australia. It is a ground orchid with a single hairy leaf and a single green to yellowish-green flower with dark red central stripes. It is a rare species and in 2006 the total population was estimated to be between 35 and 80 mature plants.

Description
The lateral sepals are a similar length to the dorsal sepal but slightly wider, curve downwards and are nearly parallel to each other. Flowering occurs from August to October.

Taxonomy and naming
Caladenia macroclavia was first formally described by David Jones in 1991 from a specimen collected near Minlaton, and the description was published in Australian Orchid Research. The specific epithet (macroclavia) is derived from the Ancient Greek word μακρός makros meaning "long" and the Latin word clava meaning "club", referring to the long "clubs" on the sepals.

Distribution and habitat
The large-club spider orchid grows in mallee woodland on the Yorke Peninsula.

Conservation
The total population of C. macroclavia was estimated in 2006 to be between 35 and 80 mature plants in five populations, with 95% of the individual plants in one sub-population on private land and fewer than five plants in each of the other populations. The species is listed as "Endangered" under the South Australian National Parks and Wildlife Act and the Commonwealth Government Environment Protection and Biodiversity Conservation Act 1999.

References 

macroclavia
Plants described in 1991
Endemic orchids of Australia
Orchids of South Australia
Taxa named by David L. Jones (botanist)